Private Practice is an American medical drama series created by Shonda Rhimes and produced and broadcast by ABC. The series is a spin-off from Rhimes' other series, Grey's Anatomy. The two-part episode "The Other Side of This Life" (which aired as the twenty-second and twenty-third episodes of Grey's Anatomy third season in the Spring of 2007) served as the backdoor pilot for this series. The story follows Dr. Addison Montgomery as she relocates from the fictional Seattle Grace Hospital in Seattle, Washington to the Oceanside Wellness Group in Santa Monica, California.

A total of 111 episodes of Private Practice were aired over six seasons, between September 26, 2007 and January 22, 2013.

Series overview

Episodes

Backdoor pilot (2007) 

An expanded two hour broadcast of Grey's Anatomy served as a backdoor pilot for Private Practice. In the two episodes from Grey's Anatomy's third season, Addison Montgomery visits friend and reproductive endocrinology and infertility specialist Naomi Bennett in Los Angeles to discuss whether or not she could have a baby. During her trip, Addison becomes acquainted with the Oceanside Wellness Center, the medical practice in which a majority of Private Practice takes place, and its staff. The two episodes serve to explain the reasons behind Addison's move from Seattle to Los Angeles.

Season 1 (2007)

Season 2 (2008–09)

Season 3 (2009–10)

Season 4 (2010–11)

Season 5 (2011–12)

Season 6 (2012–13)

Webisodes

References

Lists of American drama television series episodes
Private Practice (TV series)